is a town located in Shiribeshi Subprefecture, Hokkaido, Japan. Kutchan lies slightly north of the volcano Mount Yōtei, and is approximately 50 kilometers west of Sapporo. The subprefecture government offices are located in this town, making it the capital of the subprefecture.

As of April 30, 2017, the town has an estimated population of 15,573 and a population density of 60 persons per km².

Throughout Hokkaido, Kutchan is known for its proximity to the world famous Niseko powder snow region and for its production of quality potatoes and potato products. Among these products, Kutchan is most famous for manufacturing gosetsu-udon, a Japanese noodle made from potato flour. Jagata-kun, the skiing potato that is the cartoon mascot of Kutchan, indicates Kutchan's two most celebrated aspects. Jagata-kun roughly translates as, "little, fat potato boy".

Geography
Kutchan lies in a valley surrounded by mountains, notably Niseko Annupuri and Mount Yōtei.

Mountains: Yōtei (Shiribeshi Mountain) (Makkari-Nupuri in Ainu) (active volcano, 1898 m), Niseko Iwaonupuri (active volcano, 1116 m), Niseko Annupuri (1308 m)
Rivers: Shiribetsu, Kutōzan

Climate
Wintery weather lasts from early November through to early April with the snowiest month being January which averages . January is also the coldest month averaging .
Kutchan has 4 very distinct seasons with reasonably short spring and autumn periods. The summer is mild with temperatures rarely getting above  and the humidity that afflicts much of Asia at this time is only felt for a short period, usually in August.

Neighboring municipalities
Shiribeshi
Abuta District: Kyōgoku, Niseko
Isoya District: Rankoshi
Iwanai District: Kyōwa
Yoichi District: Niki, Akaigawa
Kimobetsu and Makkari of the Abuta District lie on the southern side of Mount Yōtei.

History
Kutchan's name comes from the language of the Hokkaido's native Ainu people.  It attempts to mimic the pronunciation of the Ainu word ku-shan-i (which roughly translates as “the place where the channel flows”), but some claim that the name is derived from kucha-an-nai (“stream of a hunting lodge”).
1892: Cultivation begins by colonizers from Tokushima Prefecture who had settled in nearby Yoichi.
1893: The village of Kutchan is established.  It falls under the jurisdiction of the Abuta village town office (present-day Tōyako).
1896: The town office of Kutchan opens.
1899: Changes jurisdiction from Muroran Subprefecture (present-day Iburi Subprefecture) to Iwanai Subprefecture.
1906: Administered as a second-level municipality.
1910: On February 8, Rusutsu, Iwanai, and Otaru’s subprefectures were consolidated into Abuta District of Muroran Subprefecture.  Shiribeshi Subprefecture is established in Kutchan.  On April 5, the satellite village of East Kutchan (present-day Kyōgoku) is formed. Nisekoan, Higa, and the Fujizan area become part of the Shutai village administration zone (present-day Niseko)
1916: Administered as a town-level municipality
1991: 100-year anniversary is celebrated.

Economy

Agriculture
Along with short grain white rice, much of Kutchan's surrounding area is devoted to potato cultivation.

Hirafu
Kutchan hosts the Hirafu skiing area.  Hirafu is commonly mistaken as a section of Niseko town since it is a part of the greater Niseko skiing region. However, to the financial benefit of Kutchan, Hirafu lies within the confines of Kutchan town. Hirafu's largest ski resort, Niseko Grand Hirafu, draws the highest number of both domestic and foreign skiers and snowboarders than any other resort in the Niseko region. It is linked to the ski areas of Annupuri, Higashiyama, and Hanazono which together may be skied on one lift pass.

In recent years,  an explosively high number of Australians have frequented Hirafu, many of whom have settled in the area and spawned businesses such as pensions, bars, and cafes.

Hirafu is also frequented by a considerable number of tourists from Hong Kong, as well as tourists coming from within Japan.

Hirafu's expanding tourism industry is often attributed to the steady and copious supply of fresh powder snow, which many claim is among the best in the entire hemisphere, if not the world.

While Hirafu's economic boom is undoubtedly an asset to Kutchan town, many fear that such rapid development will alter the price margin of goods and services offered in the village, and subsequently transform the local flavor of Hirafu. The local community of both Japanese and foreign "backpacker" skiers and snowboarders, who typically operate on a smaller budget than their upscale counterparts, are already being overshadowed by the burgeoning influx of wealthy tourists.

Education

Public High Schools
Hokkaido Kutchan High School
Hokkaido Kutchan Agriculture High School

Middle schools
Kutchan

Elementary schools
Kutchan, Hokuyo, Higashi, Nishi, Kabayama Branch School

Transportation

Airways

Airport
New Chitose Airport is the closest major airport to the town, about 2 hours away by car.

Railways
Hokkaido Passenger Railroad Company (JR Hokkaido)
Hakodate Main Line: Hirafu Station – Kutchan Station
Formerly, the Iburi Line served Kutchan from Date's Monbetsu Station of the Muroran Line, but it was discontinued in 1986.
JR Hokkaido plans to include Kutchan in its planned Hokkaido Shinkansen (bullet train) service, which would connect the town to Honshū and, consequently, Tokyo.

Roadways

Japan National Route
Route 5
Route 276
Route 393

Prefectural highways
Hokkaido Route 58 (Kutchan – Niseko)
Hokkaido Route 271 (Kutchan stop)
Hokkaido Route 343 (Rankoshi – Niseko – Kutchan)
Hokkaido Route 478 (Kyogoku – Kutchan)
Hokkaido Route 631 (Niseko – Takahara – Hirafu)

Culture

As the main regional center of population, Kutchan hosts a variety of cultural institutions and events. The town is home to two museums, the Kutchan Natural History Museum and the Shu Ogawara Art Museum.  It also hosts the annual Mt. Niseko Kutchan Jazz Festival every July in the center of town, drawing thousands to enjoy the music of Japanese and Australian musicians.

Jagata-kun
Due to the heavy snowfalls in the region, Kutchan hosts several alpine resorts frequented by domestic and international skiers and snowboarders. In the summer, Kutchan is best known for its primary agricultural product: potatoes. The town's two main industries (ski resorts and potato farming) are both reflected in Jagata-kun, a skiing potato.

Places of interest
Mount Yōtei
Niseko Annupuri
Niseko Mt. Resort Grand Hirafu

Famous persons
 Kokona Hiraki, Olympic skateboarder
Masami Yuki, a manga artist born and raised in Kutchan

Sister cities

 St. Moritz, Switzerland, since March 19, 1964
 Vail, Colorado, United States
 Zikhron Ya'akov, Israel
 Westerland, Germany

See also
Niseko, Hokkaido
Hokkaido Railway Company

References

External links

Official Website 
The Kutchannel

Towns in Hokkaido
Populated places established in 1893
1893 establishments in Japan